Yılan Island (literally Snake Island) is a Mediterranean island in Turkey.

At the past it was one of the Xenagorou islands.

The shortest distance to the main land (Anatolia) is about .Sıçam Island, a smaller island is to the north east of Yılan Island. The deep sea to the southern shore of the island is ideal for underwater sports.

References

Islands of Turkey
Islands of Antalya Province
Kaş District
Mediterranean islands